Brunei participated in the 2014 Asian Games in Incheon, South Korea from 19 September to 4 October 2014.

Fencing

Karate

Sepaktakraw

Men's double regu
Team
Hadi Ariffin Bin Matali AbdulAng IsmailJamaludin Haji Marzi

Preliminary

Group B

Taekwondo

References

Nations at the 2014 Asian Games
2014
Asian Games